Sara Anne Eriksson (born January 23, 1974 in Luleå) is a retired amateur Swedish freestyle wrestler, who competed in the women's middleweight category. Considered one of the world's top female wrestlers of her decade, Eriksson has yielded a remarkable tally of fourteen career medals, including two golds at the World Championships (1995 and 1996) and three more at the European Championships (1996, 2000, and 2002). She also had an opportunity to compete for Sweden at the 2004 Summer Olympics, finishing tenth in the 63-kg division. Before her sporting career ended shortly after the Games, Eriksson trained as a member of the wrestling team for Örgryte Sporting Club in Gothenburg, under her personal coach and husband Pierre Dikanda.

Eriksson emerged herself into a sporting fame at the 1995 World Wrestling Championships in Atlanta, Georgia, United States, where she captured the gold medal over neighboring Norway's Lene Aanes in the 57-kg division. By the following year, she campaigned her title defense in the same tournament in Sofia, Bulgaria, and then boasted for another gold at the European Championships in Oslo, Norway. Before her major Olympic debut, Eriksson held a stunning combined record of thirteen medals; three of which came from the World Championships, and the rest from the European Championships, including two more golds to her career hardware. At the 2002 World Wrestling Championships in Chalcis, Greece, Eriksson overcame her six-year struggle to reach the final match in the 63-kg division, but settled only for the silver medal after being pinned by Japan's Kaori Icho.

When women's wrestling made its debut at the 2004 Summer Olympics in Athens, Eriksson qualified for the Swedish squad, as a 30-year-old veteran, in the 63 kg class. Earlier in the process, she earned an Olympic spot by taking second at the Olympic Qualification Tournament in Tunis, Tunisia after missing out a coveted place from the World Championships. Eriksson lost her opening match 3–0 to Germany's Stéphanie Groß, and followed it with a 3–5 thrashing from Greece's Stavroula Zygouri in front of the home crowd, leaving her on the bottom of the pool and placing tenth in the final standings.

References

External links
Profile – International Wrestling Database

1974 births
Living people
Swedish female sport wrestlers
Olympic wrestlers of Sweden
Wrestlers at the 2004 Summer Olympics
People from Luleå
World Wrestling Championships medalists
European Wrestling Championships medalists
Sportspeople from Norrbotten County